Victor Anastasi (born 1913 in Valletta, died 15 November 1992) was a Maltese designer. He worked as a draughtsman with the Public Works Department, and although he never formally studied architecture, he was involved in the design process of numerous buildings. He was an admirer of Italian architecture, and often traveled to Rome where he often met with Maltese artists who were studying there.

His most famous work is the Triton Fountain in Valletta, which he designed along with the sculptor Vincent Apap in the 1950s. Anastasi designed the architectural and technical elements of the fountain, while Apap worked on the sculpture of the three bronze Tritons. Anastasi was not mentioned on the fountain's proposal since PWD employees were ineligible in the competition.

He also designed the Malta College of Arts, Science and Technology (now the Ġ. F. Abela Junior College) in Msida, which was designed and built between 1962 and 1966.

References

1913 births
1992 deaths
Maltese designers
Architectural designers
Draughtsmen
20th-century Maltese architects